Barbara A. Selkridge (born 7 June 1971) is an Antigua and Barbuda sprinter. She competed in the women's 400 metres at the 1988 Summer Olympics.

References

1971 births
Living people
Athletes (track and field) at the 1988 Summer Olympics
Antigua and Barbuda female sprinters
Olympic athletes of Antigua and Barbuda
Place of birth missing (living people)
Olympic female sprinters